Bobur Shokirjonov (or Babur Shakirdzhanov, ; born December 5, 1990 in Tashkent) is an Uzbekistan javelin thrower. He achieved a sixth-place finish at the 2008 IAAF World Junior Championships in Bydgoszcz, Poland.

At age seventeen, Shokirjonov made his official debut for the 2008 Summer Olympics in Beijing, where he competed in the men's javelin throw. He placed thirty-third overall in the qualifying rounds, with a throw of 69.54 metres.

Competition record

Seasonal bests by year

2008 - 78.92
2009 - 79.31
2010 - 74.73
2011 - 78.39
2012 - 77.65
2013 - 77.50
2014 - 79.83
2015 - 84.24
2016 - 74.96

References

External links

Living people
1990 births
Sportspeople from Tashkent
Uzbekistani male javelin throwers
Olympic athletes of Uzbekistan
Athletes (track and field) at the 2008 Summer Olympics
Athletes (track and field) at the 2016 Summer Olympics
Athletes (track and field) at the 2010 Asian Games
Athletes (track and field) at the 2014 Asian Games
Asian Games competitors for Uzbekistan
Competitors at the 2015 Summer Universiade